Murexsul reunionensis is a species of sea snail, a marine gastropod mollusk in the family Muricidae, the murex snails or rock snails.

Description

Distribution
This marine species occurs off Réunion.

References

 Houart, R., 1985. Report on Muricidae (Gastropoda) recently dredged in the south-western Indian Ocean-I. Description of eight new species. Venus 44(3): 159-171

Muricidae
Gastropods described in 1985